Eupithecia monacheata is a moth in the family Geometridae. It is found in North America, including Arizona and California.

References

Moths described in 1922
monacheata
Moths of North America